Wang Pengyao (born 2 May 2000) is a Chinese para-snowboarder who competes in the SB-UL category.

Career
He represented China at the 2022 Winter Paralympics and won a silver medal in the snowboard cross event.

References 

2000 births
Living people
Chinese male snowboarders
Paralympic snowboarders of China
Snowboarders at the 2022 Winter Paralympics
Medalists at the 2022 Winter Paralympics
Paralympic medalists in snowboarding
Paralympic silver medalists for China
21st-century Chinese people